Samuel Hoyt may refer to:

 Samuel Hoyt Elbert (1907–1997), American linguist
 Samuel Hoyt Venable (1852–1905), American businessman
 Samuel Pierce Hoyt (1807–1889), American merchant and farmer

See also
 Samuel P. Hoyt House, mansion house of Samuel Pierce Hoyt
 Sam Hoyt (born 1962), American politician